Preston Vaughn "Putty" Overall (June 5, 1897 – January 1, 1974) was an American football player and coach of football, basketball, and baseball. He served as the head coach of football, baseball, and basketball  at Tennessee Polytechnic Institute, now known as Tennessee Technological University. He came out of retirement in 1952 and coached Tech's football team, posting a 9–1 regular season record plus an invitation to the 1953 Tangerine Bowl. Overall played football at Middle Tennessee State, where he was captain of the 1917 team,  as well as one year with Dan McGugin's Vanderbilt Commodores, in 1921. The First Fifty Years: A History of Middle Tennessee State College tells us "During his Murfreesboro days, "Putty Overall" was a hulking giant of two hundred and seventy-five pounds who required custom-made uniforms." He was honored in 1961 as a distinguished alumnus of Middle Tennessee State University. In 1966, he was inducted into the Tennessee Sports Hall of Fame.

Overall died on January 1, 1974, at a hospital in Nashville, Tennessee.

Head coaching record

Football

References

External links
 

1897 births
1974 deaths
American football guards
American football tackles
Basketball coaches from Tennessee
College men's basketball head coaches in the United States
Middle Tennessee Blue Raiders football players
Vanderbilt Commodores football players
Tennessee Tech Golden Eagles athletic directors
Tennessee Tech Golden Eagles football coaches
Tennessee Tech Golden Eagles baseball coaches
Tennessee Tech Golden Eagles men's basketball coaches
People from Murfreesboro, Tennessee
Players of American football from Tennessee